Statistics of Qatar Stars League for the 1992–93 season.

Overview
Al-Arabi Sports Club won the championship.

References
Qatar - List of final tables (RSSSF)

Qatar
1